was a town located in Minamitakaki District, Nagasaki Prefecture, Japan.

As of 2003, the town had an estimated population of 8,990 and a density of 385.18 persons per km². The total area was 23.34 km².

On March 31, 2006, Arie, along with the towns of Fukae, Futsu, Kazusa, Kitaarima, Kuchinotsu, Minamiarima and Nishiarie (all from Minamitakaki District), was merged to create the city of Minamishimabara.

External links
 Minamishimabara official website 

Dissolved municipalities of Nagasaki Prefecture